RMS Andania was a passenger-cargo ship built by Scotts Shipbuilding and Engineering Company of Greenock. She was launched on 22 March 1913 and was completed on 13 July 1913.

In World War I Andania was used to transport the Royal Inniskilling Fusiliers and Royal Dublin Fusiliers to Cape Helles for the landings at Suvla. The landing at Suvla Bay by the British IX Corps was part of the August Offensive during the Battle of Gallipoli.

Description
Andania measured 13,405 gross register tons. The hull was made of steel and the vessel was propelled by a twin propeller configuration, powered by eight quadruple-expansion engines creating a service speed of 15 knots. The ship could accommodate 520 second-class and 1,540 third-class passengers. The old-style third class dormitories were replaced by four or six-berth cabins."

History
The Andania made its maiden voyage on 14 July 1913 from Liverpool via Southampton to Quebec and Montreal. In August 1914 it was requisitioned as a troopship and made several trips carrying Canadian troops. For a few weeks in 1915 the Andania was used to accommodate German POWs in the Thames. In the summer of 1915 it was used in the Gallipoli campaign when she was used to transport the Royal Inniskilling Fusiliers and Royal Dublin Fusiliers to Cape Helles for the landings at Suvla. In late December 1915, she transported the 13th and 14th York and Lancaster Regiment (Barnsley Pals) from Plymouth to Port Said in Egypt, for the defence of the Suez Canal.

After transporting more Canadian troops in 1916, it returned to passenger service in 1917 on the Liverpool-New York route. The Andania left Liverpool on 26 January 1918 with 40 passengers and a crew of around 200. It was part of a convoy of seven ships. On 27 January the ship was hit amidships by a torpedo from German submarine  captained by Leo Hillebrand two miles north-northeast of Rathlin East (Altacarry Head) lighthouse  on Rathlin Island (County Antrim). The ship immediately took a list to starboard and began to sink. Attempts were made to tow the ship but it sank after a few hours. The passengers were saved, but Andania's sinking killed seven crew members. The wreck is lying at a depth of between 175 and 189 metres.

Footnotes

Ships of the Cunard Line
Passenger ships of the United Kingdom
World War I shipwrecks in the Atlantic Ocean
Maritime incidents in 1918
1913 ships
Ships sunk by German submarines in World War I
Shipwrecks of Northern Ireland